Budy-Zbroszki  is a village in the administrative district of Gmina Winnica, within Pułtusk County, Masovian Voivodeship, in east-central Poland. It is located approximately 500 metres north-east of the village of Zbroszki-Stanisławowo and 13 km to the east of the Gmina Świercze railway station. There are only around 12 buildings in the area, putting it close to the definition of hamlet.

References

Budy-Zbroszki